Magna Powertrain is a major American manufacturer of transmission and drivetrain systems owned by Magna International. It was formed from multiple subsidiaries and acquisitions. In addition to producing transmission systems and drivetrain systems, they also provide metal-forming and engineering services.

History 
In 1988, Magna formed Tesma International to manufacture engine and transmission parts. Tesma was spun off into a public company in 1995 while retaining affiliation with Magna. 

In April 2004, Magna transferred operations of Magna Steyr Powertrain to a new subsidiary called Magna Drivetrain to focus on engineering and assembly of chassis, driveline subsystems, and modules. Magna stated the new company would better address the growing importance of all-wheel drive powertrains. In September 2004, Magna acquired the global operations of New Venture Gear from DaimlerChrysler for an estimated price of $435 million, and integrated it with Magna Drivetrain. The acquisition helped establish the newly formed Magna Drivetrain group as a major supplier of four-wheel and all-wheel drive systems manufactured in Europe and North America.

Tesma was privatized again by Magna in December 2004. In 2005, Magna merged Magna Drivetrain with Tesma to form Magna Powertrain. In July 2015 Magna Powertrain acquired Getrag, a major transmission manufacturer, for $1.9 billion. The acquisition gave Magna Powertrain access to Getrag's transmission systems, including recent hybrid designs.

Customers 
Major customers include:
General Motors (GMC, Buick, Cadillac, Chevrolet)
Mercedes-Benz Group (Mercedes-Benz)
Tata (Jaguar)
BMW (BMW, MINI)
Ferrari
Stellantis North America (Jeep, Chrysler, Dodge, Ram)
Ford (Ford, Lincoln).

Products 
Magna Powertrain is divided into two manufacturing group, their transmission systems and their driveline systems groups. The transmission systems group was formed in 2016 from the acquisition of Getrag. The group produces manual, dual-clutch, and hybrid transmissions formerly produced by Getrag. The driveline systems group produces four-wheel drive and all-wheel drive driveline systems. They produce transverse and longitudinal drivetrain layouts for a variety of vehicle types. The company also has a metal-forming group and an engineering services group.

Locations

Manufacturing plants 
Magna Powertrain has manufacturing plants in Canada, Mexico, the United States, Austria, France, Germany, Italy, Slovakia, China, India, and South Korea.

Canada 
Aurora, Ontario
Mississauga, Ontario
Markham, Ontario
Vaughan, Ontario

Mexico 
Irapuato, Guanajuato
Ramos Arizpe, Coahuila

United States 
Lansing, Michigan
Muncie, Indiana
Sterling Heights, Michigan

Austria 
Albersdorf
Ilz (Styria)
Lannach
St. Valentin
Traiskirchen

France 
Bordeaux

Germany 
Bad Windsheim
Neuenstein
Roitzsch
Rosenberg

Italy 
Modugno

Slovakia 
Kechnec

China 
Changzhou, Jiangsu
Ganzhou, Jiangxi
Nanchang, Jiangxi
Tianjin

India 
Sanand, Gujarat

South Korea 
Asan

Offices 
Magna Powertrain also has offices not located within a manufacturing plant in France, Germany, China, India, Japan, South Korea.

France 
Paris

Germany 
Cologne
Munich
St. Georgen
Untergruppenbach

China 
Shanghai

India 
Pune, India

Japan 
Tokyo

South Korea 
Seoul

Joint ventures
In November 2006, Magna Powertrain and Amtek Auto Ltd. signed a 50-50 joint venture to establish a manufacturing facility outside of New Delhi, for two-piece flexplate assemblies for automotive applications. In October 2007, Magna Powertrain and RICO Auto Industries Ltd, a full-service Indian-based powertrain components and assemblies supplier, signed a 50-50 joint venture to establish a new manufacturing facility located in Gurgaon. The facility produces oil and water pumps with aluminum housings for automotive engine applications for Indian and European markets.

In January 2009, WIA Corporation and Magna Powertrain formed a 50-50 joint ventures to establish a new manufacturing facility located in Asan, Korea. The facility produces and supplies all-wheel-drive couplings for Hyundai Motor Group.

In July 2021, LG and Magna Powertrain formed a LG majority (51%-49%) joint venture to establish LG Magna e-Powertrain in Incheon, South Korea. The goal of the joint venture is to manufacture electric motors, inverters, on-board chargers and other "e-drive systems."

References

Magna International